Børge Nielsen (19 October 1924 – December 2017) was a Danish gymnast. He competed in eight events at the 1952 Summer Olympics.

References

1924 births
2017 deaths
Danish male artistic gymnasts
Olympic gymnasts of Denmark
Gymnasts at the 1952 Summer Olympics